An electrostatic-sensitive device (often abbreviated ESD) is any component (primarily electrical) which can be damaged by common static charges which build up on people, tools, and other non-conductors or semiconductors. ESD commonly also stands for electrostatic discharge.

Overview
As electronic parts like computer central processing units (CPUs) become packed more and more densely with transistors the transistors shrink and become more and more vulnerable to ESD.

Common electrostatic-sensitive devices include:

 MOSFET transistors, used to make integrated circuits (ICs)
 CMOS ICs (chips), integrated circuits built with MOSFETs. Examples are computer CPUs, graphics ICs.
 Computer cards
 TTL chips
 Laser diodes
 Blue light-emitting diodes (LEDs)
 High precision resistors

The notion of a symbol for an ESD protection device came about in response to the increased usage and failures of static sensitive components by then the computer systems manufacturer, Sperry Univac. Field repairs to and handling of ESD printed circuit boards (PCBs) were resulting in extremely high failure rates. Studies of PCB failures indicated that static damage to chips and PCBs were being caused by field service engineers who were often unaware of the need to employ precautionary procedures in handling ESD sensitive parts. In response to this problem, Robert F. Gabriel, a Systems Engineer at Sperry Univac devised a large number of possible symbols that could be affixed to parts, packaging, and PCBs to alert the user that the part is ESD-sensitive. Gabriel developed a proposal for an ESD warning symbol and circulated it to numerous electronics standards groups. C. Everett Coon at the EIA (Electronics Industry Association) enthusiastically responded to the concept and coordinated a world-wide effort among various standards bodies and interest groups to devise an appropriate symbol that would be void of any verbiage and be quickly recognizable that handling precautions were necessary for the ESD item. After three years of worldwide debate over the graphics and the color scheme that would be used the symbol at the top right of this page was adopted in the late 1970s. Variations to the design have been adopted afterwards by some but the most recognizable symbol remains as was adopted.

ESD-safe working 

Often an ESD-safe foam or ESD-safe bag are required for transporting such components. When working with them, a technician will often use a grounding mat or other grounding tool to keep from damaging the equipment. A technician may also wear antistatic garments or an antistatic wrist strap.

There are several kinds of ESD protective materials:

 Conductive: Materials with an electrical resistance between 1kΩ and 1MΩ
 Dissipative: Materials with an electrical resistance between 1MΩ and 1TΩ
 Shielding: Materials that attenuate current and electrical fields
 Low-charging or Anti-static: Materials that limit the buildup of charge by prevention of triboelectric effects through physical separation or by selecting materials that do not build up charge easily.

See also

 Antistatic agent
 Antistatic device
 Antistatic garments
 Electrostatic discharge materials

References

External links 
 ESD Association
 Avoid Static Damage to Your PC, from PC World
 ESD advice from Intel
 Tips for Enhancing ESD Protection, for board designers

Electromagnetic compatibility

de:Elektrostatische Entladung#Elektrostatisch empfindliche Bauelemente